Tom Beugelsdijk (7 August 1990) is a Dutch professional footballer who plays as a centre-back for Eerste Divisie club Helmond Sport.

Club career
Beugelsdijk was born in The Hague. He formerly played for ADO Den Haag and was loaned out to FC Dordrecht, in the Dutch second division, the Eerste Divisie during the 2010–11 and 2011–12 season.

In the summer of 2011, he returned to ADO Den Haag and he was one of the selected in the first Europa League match of ADO against FK Tauras.

FSV Frankfurt
After being linked with Birmingham City, including being shown round the stadium, It was announced by German side FSV Frankfurt's Twitter that on 21 May 2014, Tom Beugelsdijk was joining them from ADO Den Haag on a free transfer.

ADO Den Haag
After a year in Germany, in 2015 Beugelsdijk returned to ADO Den Haag where he became a cult hero at the club due to his fighting mentality.

Sparta Rotterdam
Beugelsdijk joined Sparta Rotterdam on 14 August 2020, signing two-year contract.

In July 2022, he was suspended for five matches after betting on games in which he himself participated.

Helmond Sport
Beugelsdijk signed a three-year contract with Eerste Divisie club Helmond Sport on 16 July 2022.

Career statistics

References

External links
 
 
 Tom Beugelsdijk on Voetbal International 

1990 births
Living people
Footballers from The Hague
Association football central defenders
Dutch footballers
ADO Den Haag players
FC Dordrecht players
FSV Frankfurt players
Sparta Rotterdam players
Helmond Sport players
Eredivisie players
Eerste Divisie players
2. Bundesliga players
Dutch expatriate footballers
Expatriate footballers in Germany
Dutch expatriate sportspeople in Germany